In family law in the United Kingdom implacable hostility denotes the attitude shown by one parent to another in denying access to, or contact with, their child(ren) after separation or divorce. What differentiates implacable hostility from the typical hostility that may arise after separation/divorce is that the deep-rooted nature of the hostility cannot be justified on rational grounds and measures taken by third parties including mediators and the family courts are to no avail.

See also 
Domestic violence
Emotional abuse
Parental alienation
Parental alienation syndrome

References

Child custody